Ollur State assembly constituency is one of the 140 state legislative assembly constituencies in Kerala. It is also one of the 7 state legislative assembly constituencies included in the Thrissur Lok Sabha constituency. As of the 2021 assembly elections, the current MLA is K. Rajan of CPI.

Ollur was a citadel of Indian National Congress for a long time, yet occasionally it had gone to Communist Party of India. The constituency has 1,00,750 male and 1,07,128 female voters. Ollur has been a bellwether constituency since 1982. Every MLA since 1982 has been part of the ruling party or alliance in Kerala.

Local self governed segments
Ollur Niyama Sabha constituency is composed of the following 14 wards of the Thrissur Municipal Corporation (Ollur zone, Mannuthy zone and Koorkenchery zone), and 4 Gram Panchayats in Thrissur Taluk:

Members of Legislative Assembly 
The following list contains all members of Kerala legislative assembly who have represented the constituency:

Key

Election results

Niyamasabha Election 2016 
There were 1,93,404 registered voters in the constituency for the 2016 election.

Niyamasabha Election 2011 
There were 1,76,875 registered voters in the constituency for the 2011 election.

References

State assembly constituencies in Thrissur district
Assembly constituencies of Kerala